Bodani may refer to:

 The city Bođani in Serbia 
 The town of Rewas - Bodani in Maharashtra, India